The Uluguru forest tree frog or ruby-eyed tree frog (Leptopelis uluguruensis) is a species of frog in the family Arthroleptidae endemic to Tanzania.
Its natural habitats are subtropical or tropical moist lowland forest, subtropical or tropical moist montane forest, rivers, and intermittent freshwater marshes.
It is threatened by habitat loss.

References

Leptopelis
Taxonomy articles created by Polbot
Amphibians described in 1928